Ali Abdulla Hassan Haram (born 11 December 1988) is a Bahraini footballer who plays as a forward for Al-Riffa and the Bahrain national team.

Career
Haram was included in Bahrain's squad for the 2019 AFC Asian Cup in the United Arab Emirates.

He played in the qualification match for the 2021 FIFA Arab Cup, scoring a goal in the match against Kuwait.

Career statistics

International

References

External links
 
 
 
 Ali Haram at WorldFootball.com

1988 births
Living people
Bahraini footballers
Bahrain international footballers
Association football forwards
Sitra Club players
Al Hala SC players
Hidd SCC players
Riffa SC players
Bahraini Premier League players
2019 AFC Asian Cup players